Filmel C. Johnson (born December 24, 1970) is a former American football defensive back. He played for the Buffalo Bills in 1995.

References

1970 births
Living people
St. Mary's Preparatory alumni
Players of American football from Detroit
American football defensive backs
Illinois Fighting Illini football players
Buffalo Bills players